James Robert Cockle (born 26 May 1986 in Edmonton, England) is a former professional speedway rider from England.

Cockle was a member of the Scunthorpe Scorpions team that won the Conference League Championship  in 2007.

References 

1986 births
Living people
British speedway riders
Glasgow Tigers riders
Rye House Rockets riders
Sheffield Tigers riders
Scunthorpe Scorpions riders
Mildenhall Fen Tigers riders
Birmingham Brummies riders